CollabraSpace is a computer software and consulting services company located in Annapolis Junction, MD.

The company is a provider and developer of secure, real-time, web-based collaboration software for government and commercial clients, with a traditional market in the Intelligence Community, Department of Defense (DoD) and other public and private agencies with enterprise software needs. CollabraSpace also offers professional consulting services to support visible, mission critical programs in the intel agencies. The majority of its employees are software, systems and database engineers and operational research experts.

History
CollabraSpace was founded in July 1998 and was originally called NuVenture Software Solutions, LLC.

Company President and CEO, Ray Schwemmer, already working with collaboration technologies in an applied research lab, joined a federally funded research effort which created a collaborative environment for use across the DOD.  The system was successful in providing a secure way for analysts around the world to work together regardless of their geographic location.

While working on the project, Schwemmer saw firsthand the benefits of collaboration for both the government and commercial worlds. He recognized a need for organizations to enable their system and human assets to work together within and across enterprises. He came up with the idea of creating a product that could solve complex problems, take advantage of real time opportunities, resolve real time obstacles and more efficiently achieve mission goals.

Schwemmer began conversations about his idea with Rick Havrilla and Chris Murphy, former co-workers and software developers with experience as technology consultants and convinced them of the potential. The three then worked together to create a secure forum where people could come together and exchange ideas instantly, as well as safely and collectively store, manage, review and share information. In 1999, Rooms 1.0, an early version of CollabraSuite, was released

In 2001, the privately held company incorporated, opened up an office in Annapolis, Maryland and began to hire employees. The name of the company was changed to CollabraSpace and, following soon after, Rooms became CollabraSuite.

In 2007 CollabraSpace shifted its focus to Professional Services in support of the DOD and IC while maintaining its product, CollabraSuite.  In 2012 the company moved its headquarters to Annapolis Junction, Maryland.  The company continues to support mission critical programs.

Product

CollabraSuite is a suite of collaboration products. The real-time software provides a secure environment for communication and sharing among multiple parties. CollabraSuite is a set of graphical modules that can be assembled based on an organization's requirements. The software can function within an existing web-based application or as a standalone Java application. An open Application Programming Interface (API) allows an organization's existing data and existing business critical systems to integrate with CollabraSuite.

CollabraSpace offers three editions of CollabraSuite:

 CollabraSuite Basic Edition
 CollabraSuite Advanced Edition
 CollabraSuite Premium Edition

Services
CollabraSpace provides professional consulting services to support mission critical programs in the areas of Technical Design and Architecture, Systems Engineering, Software Development, Software Testing, Systems Security and Operations Research.

Partners
 Northrop Grumman
 Lockheed Martin
 Booz Allen Hamilton
 SAIC
 General Dynamics
 Boeing

References

Privately held companies based in Maryland
Engineering consulting firms of the United States
Defense companies of the United States
Companies established in 2001